Pühalepa Parish was a rural municipality of Hiiu County, Estonia.

Villages
There were 47 villages in Pühalepa Parish: 
Ala - Aruküla - Hagaste - Harju - Hausma - Hellamaa - Heltermaa - Hiiessaare - Hilleste - Kalgi - Kerema - Kõlunõmme - Kukka - Kuri - Leerimetsa - Linnumäe - Lõbembe - Loja - Lõpe - Määvli - Nõmba - Nõmme - Palade - Paluküla - Partsi - Pilpaküla - Prählamäe - Pühalepa - Puliste - Reikama - Sääre - Sakla - Salinõmme - Sarve - Soonlepa - Suuremõisa - Suuresadama - Tammela - Tareste - Tempa - Tubala - Undama - Vahtrepa - Valipe - Värssu - Viilupi - Vilivalla

References 

Former municipalities of Estonia